The Netherlands participated in the Junior Eurovision Song Contest 2019 which was held on 24 November 2019 in Gliwice, Poland.  Matheu was selected with his song "Dans met Jou". Their entry was selected through the national selection Junior Songfestival 2019.

Background

In the 2018 contest, Anne & Max represented their country in Minsk, Belarus with the song "Samen". They ended 13th out of 20 entries with 91 points.

Before Junior Eurovision

Junior Songfestival 2019

Competing entries

Final

The final was held on 28 September 2019 at the Hanzehof Theater. Matheu was announced the winner and represented the Netherlands with "Dans met jou".

Artist and song information

Matheu
Matheu Hinzen (born 12 May 2006) is a Belgian-born Dutch singer and actor. He represented the Netherlands at the Junior Eurovision Song Contest 2019 with the song "Dans met jou". He was born in Belgium, but he currently lives in Weert. He also played a young André Hazes in the movie Bloed, zweet & tranen.

Dans met jou
"Dans met jou" (Dutch for Dance with you) is a song by Dutch singer Matheu Hinzen. He represented the Netherlands at the Junior Eurovision Song Contest 2019.

At Junior Eurovision
During the opening ceremony and the running order draw which both took place on 18 November 2019, Netherlands was drawn to perform fourteenth on 24 November 2019, following Ukraine and preceding Armenia.

Voting

Detailed voting results

References 

Junior Eurovision Song Contest 
Netherlands
2019